Kalva Srirampur is a mandal in the Peddapalli district of the Indian state of Telangana.

Villages 
Village in Kalva Srirampur Mandal

 Edulapuram
 Gangaram
 Jafarkhanpet
 Kistampet
 Kunaram
 Madipalle
 Mallial
 Mangapet
 Mirzampet
 Motlapalle
 Pandilla
 Peddampet
 Pegadapalle
 Rathupalle
 Srirampur
 Tharupalle
 Vennampalle

See also
Odela
Jammikunta

References 

Karimnagar district